Castelreng is a commune in the department in the Aude department in the Occitanie region in southern France.

Population
Its inhabitants are known as Castelrengois.

See also
Communes of the Aude department

References

Communes of Aude
Aude communes articles needing translation from French Wikipedia